Malgas is a settlement on the right (southwest) bank of the Breede River in the Overberg region of the Western Cape. It is situated 25 kilometres north-west of the Breede River mouth at Witsand, and 30 kilometres south-east of Swellendam. "Malgas" is the Afrikaans for gannet.  The word "malgas" is probably an adaptation of the Portuguese mangas de velludo, "velvet sleeves", referring to the Cape gannet (Morus capensis) with its black-tipped wings. According to the 2011 census, Malgas has a population of 44 people in 20 households. https://forebears.io/surnames/malagas   It is well known for the "pont", a man-hauled pontoon cable ferry across the Breede River, which is the last of its type in South Africa.
The man hauled ferry is currently being replaced by a motor driven ferry, which is sad, but the volume of traffic is fairly substantial so the replacement is probably due. The new ferry is a huge yellow steel pontoon with a massive diesel engine.

References

Populated places in the Swellendam Local Municipality